Maupuia on the Miramar Peninsula is an eastern suburb of Wellington to the north-west of Miramar. Developed in the 1970s, it is in the Eastern Ward.  

Maupuia had a usually resident population of 1,584 at the 2018 New Zealand census, similar to census figures from 2013 (1,599) and 2006 (1,557). As of the 2013 census, 60% of residents were European/Pākehā, 23% were Asian, 10% were Māori, and 9% were Pacific peoples.

The northern part of the peninsula, sometimes known as Crawford, includes Maupuia Park, the former Wellington Prison (also known as Mount Crawford Prison) and at the tip of the peninsula on Point Halswell the Massey Memorial, the mausoleum of former prime minister William Massey.  Shelly Bay on the west side of the peninsula is a former military (navy and air force) base and is proposed to be developed for housing. 

Other bays on the west side of the peninsula are Karaka Bay, Scorching Bay, Mahanga Bay and Kau Bay.

History  
Originally the area was the site of a Māori pa. Maupuia was part of the Miramar Borough from 1904 to 1921, when the borough was incorporated into the City of Wellington.

In 1949 the Wellington City Council exchanged with the government the Townsend Estate of 145½ acres (59 ha) on Watts (Miramar) Peninsula for 13¼ acres (5.4 ha) of Town Belt land adjacent to the Victoria University of Wellington required for expansion of the university (plus £4,000). 

The land was developed from 1970 as a prestige residential subdivision for 2,500 people ultimately; with initially 100 single houses, 170 town houses, 150 two-person flats, 246 three-person flats and 24 pensioner flats. Earthworks over two years involved moving 350,000 cubic yards (268,000 cubic meters) of spoil in 70,000 truckloads. The sections, with views of Evans Bay, the harbour and Wellington Airport were balloted. Eventually shopping and recreational facilities were to be provided.

Demographics 

Maupuia had a population of 1,584 at the 2018 New Zealand census, a decrease of 15 people (-0.9%) since the 2013 census, and an increase of 27 people (1.7%) since the 2006 census. There were 585 households. There were 792 males and 792 females, giving a sex ratio of 1.0 males per female. The median age was 36.6 years (compared with 37.4 years nationally), with 273 people (17.2%) aged under 15 years, 330 (20.8%) aged 15 to 29, 783 (49.4%) aged 30 to 64, and 198 (12.5%) aged 65 or older.

Ethnicities were 57.0% European/Pākehā, 9.7% Māori, 10.4% Pacific peoples, 25.9% Asian, and 8.3% other ethnicities (totals add to more than 100% since people could identify with multiple ethnicities).

The proportion of people born overseas was 36.4%, compared with 27.1% nationally.

Although some people objected to giving their religion, 40.3% had no religion, 34.3% were Christian, 10.8% were Hindu, 2.7% were Muslim, 2.8% were Buddhist and 4.4% had other religions.

Of those at least 15 years old, 432 (33.0%) people had a bachelor or higher degree, and 165 (12.6%) people had no formal qualifications. The median income was $38,200, compared with $31,800 nationally. The employment status of those at least 15 was that 720 (54.9%) people were employed full-time, 171 (13.0%) were part-time, and 54 (4.1%) were unemployed.

References  

Suburbs of Wellington City
Populated places around the Wellington Harbour